Thevenetimyia speciosa is a species of bee flies, insects in the family Bombyliidae.

References

Further reading

External links

 
 
 

Bombyliidae
Insects described in 1969